Elizabeth Cavendish-Bentinck ( Livingston; August 12, 1855 – November 4, 1943) was an American born member of the Livingston family who married a British Member of Parliament from the Cavendish-Bentinck family and was a prominent member of New York Society during the Gilded Age.

Early life

Elizabeth was born in Newport, Rhode Island on August 12, 1855.  She was the daughter of Ruth Baylies (1817–1918) and Maturin Livingston Jr. (1815–1888). Her parents lived at the former home of her paternal grandfather, Maturin Livingston (1769–1847), a prominent lawyer and politician from New York, in Staatsburg, New York.  Elizabeth had a twin sister, Ruth T. Livingston (1855–1920), who was the wife of Ogden Mills (1856–1929), and the mother of Ogden Livingston Mills, the United States Secretary of the Treasury.

Society life
In 1899, her cousin, Louisa Matilda Livingston, who was married to Elbridge T. Gerry, the grandson of U.S. Vice President Elbridge Gerry, gave a reception and dance in honor of their eldest daughter, Mary, in advance of her presentation the following spring at the Court of St. James and subsequent debut in London Society.  The event was also the debut of Gerry's son, Peter Robert Goelet Gerry (1879–1957).

In 1904, while renting Highcliffe Castle, the Cavendish-Bentinck's were host to King Edward VII, in Christchurch.

Elizabeth was included on Ward McAllister's list of New York's social elite during the Gilded Age, known as "Four Hundred", purported to be an index of New York's best families, published in The New York Times  She was known for being one of the many well-known transatlantic marriages between American heiresses and members of the British Peerage.

Personal life
On August 12, 1880, she married William George Cavendish-Bentinck (1854–1909), the son of The Rt. Hon. George Augustus Frederick Cavendish-Bentinck (1821–1891) and Prudentia Penelope Leslie (d. 1896), the daughter of Col. Charles Powell Leslie II (1769–1831).  His father, a British barrister and cricketer was also a Conservative member of parliament from 1859 to 1891, who was the only son of Major-General Lord Frederick Cavendish-Bentinck (1781–1828), the fourth son of Prime Minister William Cavendish-Bentinck, 3rd Duke of Portland (1738–1809), and brother to William Bentinck, 4th Duke of Portland (1768–1854).  Together, they had:

 Mary Augusta Cavendish-Bentinck (1881–1913), who married John Gorman Ford (1866–1917), the 1st Secretary of the British Legation to Rome, son of diplomat Clare Ford, on 3 November 1906.
 Ruth Evelyn Cavendish-Bentinck (1883–1978), who married Walter Spencer Morgan Burns (1872–1929), nephew of J. P. Morgan and grandson of Junius Spencer Morgan, both well-known American bankers, in 1907.

In 1909, her husband died at age 55, at Forest Farm, Windsor, Berkshire.  In 1914, she had a family mausoleum built in the Churchyard of St Giles in Hertfordshire, designed by Robert Weir Schultz.  Elizabeth died on November 4, 1943 in London.

References

1855 births
1943 deaths
Elizabeth
Elizabeth
Livingston family
People included in New York Society's Four Hundred